Ballyhoo is a baitfish species.

Ballyhoo may also refer to:

Music
Ballyhoo (album), a 1997 album by Echo & the Bunnymen
Ballyhoo (South African band)
Ballyhoo!, an American reggae rock band

Other
Ballyhoo (magazine), an American humor magazine published 1931–1954
Ballyhoo (video game), published 1985
Ballyhoo, a pinball game released in 1932

See also
Allah Hoo